The Rural Municipality of Daly is a former rural municipality (RM) in the Canadian province of Manitoba. It was originally incorporated as a rural municipality on December 22, 1883. It ceased on January 1, 2015 as a result of its provincially mandated amalgamation with the Town of Rivers to form the Riverdale Municipality.

The RM was located northwest of the City of Brandon and encompassed 553 square kilometres of prime agricultural land. It was named for Thomas Mayne Daly, a prominent Manitoba lawyer and politician.

Communities 
 Bradwardine
 Levine
 Myra
 Wheatland

Demographics

References 

 Map of Daly R.M. at Statcan
 Manitoba Historical Society Rural Municipality of Daly
 Manitoba Historical Society - Bradwardine (RM of Daly)
 Geographic Names of Manitoba (pg. 59) - the Millennium Bureau of Canada

External links 
 

Daly
Populated places disestablished in 2015
2015 disestablishments in Manitoba